Kostroma is the name of several inhabited localities in Russia.

Urban localities
Kostroma, a city in Kostroma Oblast; 

Rural localities
Kostroma, Belgorod Oblast, a selo in Prokhorovsky District of Belgorod Oblast
Kostroma, Kamchatka Krai, a selo in Karaginsky District of Kamchatka Krai
Kostroma, Sverdlovsk Oblast, a village in Kostinsky Selsoviet of Alapayevsky District in Sverdlovsk Oblast